Virginia Henry Curtiss (1875 – July 11, 1941) was president of The Heckscher Foundation for Children and was a member of New York City's Child Welfare Board.

Biography
She was born in 1875 in Vienna and educated in England. She married widower Edwin Burr Curtiss, of A. G. Spalding Bros. Curtiss commissioned the architects Carrère and Hastings, who had also designed the original clubhouse for the Greenwich Country Club, to build him a house on North Street in Greenwich, Connecticut. Curtiss died at his residence in Mountain Lake, Florida on March 30, 1928

After his death, 55 year old Virginia married 81 year old August Heckscher on July 2, 1930 in the parsonage of the Asbury Methodist Episcopal Church in Croton-on-Hudson, New York.  August Heckscher, who was born in Hamburg, Germany, died on April 26, 1941 at their home in Mountain Lake, Florida and left his widow $10,000 and all his real estate. She died less than three months later on July 11, 1941. No legatee could be found that was named in her will and the probate court declared an earlier copy of the will as valid. Part of her art collection was donated to an armed forces art program.

References

1875 births
1941 deaths
Austrian philanthropists
Austro-Hungarian emigrants to the United States
Austro-Hungarian expatriates in the United Kingdom